The Parque Ibirapuera Conservação (PIC) is a nonprofit organization that identifies, preserves and enhances the natural, historical and cultural assets of Ibirapuera Park in São Paulo, Brazil. It also assists other Brazilian local communities to care for their local urban parks. Until 2017, the organization provided nearly $1.5 million in aid to support Ibirapuera Park through restoration and volunteer work by its members and donors, contributions from Park-area residents,  corporations and foundations.

History 
In late 2010, a few determined members of Ibirapuera Park Management Council did not seem satisfied with municipality lack of capital to restore and care for the park, and started to seek donations and private support to foster CAPEX projects. By 2014, Parque Ibirapuera Conservação was founded following the steps' of Central Park Conservancy to function as a private partner at engaging its neighborhood into a local and pioneering project to professionalize stewardship through civil society.

Until 2017, PIC major works in Ibirapuera Park included the Reading Grove restoration, upgraded a part of its irrigation system, research and conservation actions, volunteer engagement, and created interpretive programs.

Parks Concession 
In 2017, the city of São Paulo announced that Ibirapuera Park would be part of a large municipal concession program, as Parque Ibirapuera Conservação initiatives had become a key piece of urban parks' transformation, and raised public and political interest to delegate the entire parks management into private hands. The concession took longer that the municipality envisaged, and PIC acted as a key influencer guaranteeing a prior development of an update master plan for the park. It argued that no matter what model the municipality chose to adopt to manage its parks, the control should remain public.

References

External links 
 

Environmental organisations based in Brazil
Non-profit organisations based in Brazil
Nature conservation organizations based in South America
Nature conservation in Brazil
Public–private partnership projects